Minimum Wage Fixing Convention 1970 (no 131) is a Convention by the International Labour Organization established in 1970. The preamble stated:
Noting the terms of the Minimum Wage-Fixing Machinery Convention, 1928, and the Equal Remuneration Convention, 1951, which have been widely ratified, as well as of the Minimum Wage Fixing Machinery (Agriculture) Convention, 1951, and

Considering that these Convention have played a valuable part in protecting disadvantaged groups of wage earners, and

Considering that the time has come to adopt a further instrument complementing these Conventions and providing protection for wage earners against unduly low wages, which, while of general application, pays special regard to the needs of developing countries, and

Having decided upon the adoption of certain proposals with regard to minimum wage fixing machinery and related problems, with special reference to developing countries,..

Ratifications
As of October 2020, the convention has been ratified by 54 states.

External links 
Text.
Ratifications.

International Labour Organization conventions
Minimum wage law
Treaties concluded in 1970
Treaties entered into force in 1972
Treaties of Albania
Treaties of Antigua and Barbuda
Treaties of Armenia
Treaties of Australia
Treaties of Azerbaijan
Treaties of Bolivia
Treaties of Bosnia and Herzegovina
Treaties of the military dictatorship in Brazil
Treaties of Burkina Faso
Treaties of Cameroon
Treaties of the Central African Republic
Treaties of Chile
Treaties of Costa Rica
Treaties of Cuba
Treaties of Ecuador
Treaties of Egypt
Treaties of El Salvador
Treaties of France
Treaties of Guyana
Treaties of Guatemala
Treaties of Ba'athist Iraq
Treaties of Japan
Treaties of Kenya
Treaties of South Korea
Treaties of Kyrgyzstan
Treaties of Latvia
Treaties of Lebanon
Treaties of the Libyan Arab Republic
Treaties of Lithuania
Treaties of Malaysia
Treaties of Malta
Treaties of Mexico
Treaties of Moldova
Treaties of Montenegro
Treaties of Morocco
Treaties of Nepal
Treaties of the Netherlands
Treaties of Nicaragua
Treaties of Niger
Treaties of Portugal
Treaties of the Socialist Republic of Romania
Treaties of Serbia and Montenegro
Treaties of Slovenia
Treaties of Francoist Spain
Treaties of Sri Lanka
Treaties of Eswatini
Treaties of Syria
Treaties of Tanzania
Treaties of North Macedonia
Treaties of Ukraine
Treaties of Uruguay
Treaties of the Yemen Arab Republic
Treaties of Zambia
Treaties extended to Aruba
Treaties extended to Norfolk Island
1970 in labor relations